These are the lists of the top 100 songs of 2018 in Mexico according to Monitor Latino. Monitor Latino issued two year-end General charts: one which ranked the songs by their number of Spins (Tocadas) on the Mexican radio, and the other ranked the songs by their estimated audience. Monitor Latino also issued separate year-end charts for Regional Mexican, Pop and Anglo songs.

Spins

See also
List of number-one songs of 2018 (Mexico)
List of number-one albums of 2018 (Mexico)

References

2018 in Mexican music
Mexico Top 100
Mexican record charts